Metal Rain 1989-93 is a compilation album by Black Rain, released on November 16, 2018 by DKA Records.

Track listing

Personnel 
Adapted from the Metal Rain 1989-93 liner notes.

Black Rain
 Stuart Argabright – vocals, effects, percussion
 Chaz Cardoza (as Bones) – bass guitar, effects, vocals
 Thom Furtado – drums, percussion
 Shinichi Shimokawa – guitar, effects

Production and design
 Dietrich Schoenemann – mastering
 Hiroko Kawasaki – cover art, photography

Release history

References

External links 
 
 
 Metal Rain 1989-93 at Bandcamp
 Metal Rain 1989-93 at iTunes

2018 compilation albums
Black Rain (band) albums